Flight to Mars is a 1951 American Cinecolor science fiction film drama, produced by Walter Mirisch for Monogram Pictures, directed by Lesley Selander, that stars Marguerite Chapman, Cameron Mitchell, and Arthur Franz.

The film's storyline involves the arrival on the Red Planet of an American scientific expedition team, who discover that Mars is inhabited by an underground-dwelling but dying civilization that appears to be humanoid. The Martians are suspicious of the Earthmen's motives. A majority of their governing body finally decides to keep their visitors prisoner, never allowing them to return home with the information they have discovered. But the Earthmen have sympathizers among the Martians. Soon a plan is set in motion to smuggle the scientists and their Martian allies aboard the guarded spaceship and to make an escape for Earth.

Plot

The first expedition to Mars, led by physicist Dr. Lane, includes Professor Jackson, engineer and spaceship designer Jim Barker, and his assistant Carol Stadwick, who earned her degree in "spaceship engineering" in only three years. Journalist Steve Abbott, a decorated (Korean) war correspondent, is also aboard to cover the historic mission.

They lose contact with Earth when a meteor storm disables both their landing gear and radio. The crew are forced to decide whether to crash-land on Mars or turn back for Earth. They decide to proceed with the mission, knowing they may never return.

After they safely crash-land, the crew are met by five Martians at one of their above-ground structures. Looking human and being able to communicate in English, Ikron, the president of their planetary council, explains that they learned Earth languages from broadcasts. Their own efforts, however, to transmit messages to Earth have only resulted in faint, unintelligible signals being received.

The Earth crew are taken to a vast underground city, which is being sustained by life-support systems fueled by a (fictional) mineral called Corium. There the crew meet Tillamar, a past president and now a trusted council advisor. Terris, a young female Martian, shows them to their room and serves the group automated meals. The expedition members are amazed at the high level of Martian technology around them and soon ask the council for help with repairing their spaceship.

Discreetly, Ikron reveals that their Corium supply is nearly depleted. He recommends that the Earthmen's spaceship be reproduced, once repaired, creating a fleet that can evacuate the Martians to Earth. The council votes to adopt Ikron's plan, while also deciding to hold the Earthmen captive during the repair process. Alita, a leading Martian scientist, is placed in charge of the spaceship. Ikorn uses Terris as a spy to keep himself informed of the progress. Jim begins to suspect the Martians' motives and fakes an explosion aboard, slowing the repairs. When Jim later announces their blast-off for Earth is set for the next day, he surprises everyone with the news that Tillamar and Alita will be joining them.

Terris reports their suspicious behavior, leading to Alita and Tillimar being held, but Jim foils Ikron's plan to seize the repaired ship after freeing both. After a brief confrontation with Martian guards at the spaceship's gangway, the three make it aboard safely, and the expedition departs for Earth.

Cast
 Marguerite Chapman as Alita
 Cameron Mitchell as Steve Abbott
 Arthur Franz as Dr. Jim Barker
 Virginia Huston as Carol Stafford
 John Litel as Dr. Lane
 Morris Ankrum as Ikron
 Richard Gaines as Professor Jackson
 Lucille Barkley as Terris
 Robert Barrat as Tillamar
 Wilbur Back as Councilman
 William Bailey as Councilman
 Trevor Bardette as Alzar
 Stanley Blystone as Councilman
 David Bond as Ramay
 Raymond Bond as Astronomer No. Two

Production
Flight to Mars has some plot similarities to the Russian silent film Aelita, but unlike that earlier film it is a low-budget "quickie" shot in just five days.

The film's on location principal photography took place in Death Valley, California from May 11 through late May 1951.

Except for some of the flight instruments, Flight to Mars reuses the interior flight deck sets, somewhat redressed, and other interior props from Lippert Pictures' 1950 science fiction feature Rocketship X-M. Even that earlier film's spaceflight sound effects are reused, as are the concepts of space flight outlined in RX-M screenplay. The main difference is this film was shot in color, not black-and-white, and the flight to Mars was planned; the earlier Lippert film concerns an accidental journey to the Red Planet, which happens during a planned expedition to the Moon. Additionally, Flight to Mars postulates a humanoid species which is superior, in many ways, to humanity, and could possibly pose a long-term, strategic threat. In the Lippert film, however, the Martians are a throw-back, a consequence of a long ago nuclear holocaust, which occurred millennia earlier; those Martians pose only an immediate, tactical threat to the RX-M's crew.

A sequel, Voyage to Venus was proposed but never made.

Flight to Mars is not in the public domain. The copyright was renewed under Certificate # RE-26-731/RE-37-81 from the Copyright Office, Library of Congress. Rights were assigned to Wade Williams.

Reception
The New York Times film review notes: "Flight to Mars is the second American film of the postwar era (after the previous year's Rocketship X-M) to depict a manned space trip to the Red Planet".

See also

 1951 in film
 List of films set on Mars
 List of science fiction films of the 1950s
 Mission to Mars, a 2000 film with a similar premise.

References

Notes

Bibliography

 Miller, Thomas Kent. Mars in the Movies: A History. Jefferson, North Carolina: McFarland & Company, 2016. .
 Muirhead, Brian, Judith and Garfield Reeves-Stevens. Going to Mars: The Stories of the People Behind NASA's Mars Missions Past, Present, and Future. New York: Simon & Schuster, 2004. .
 Warren, Bill. Keep Watching the Skies: American Science Fiction Films of the Fifties, 21st Century Edition. Jefferson, North Carolina: McFarland & Company, 2009 (First Edition 1982). .
 Weaver, Tom. "Cameron Mitchell Interview". Double Feature Creature Attack: A Monster Merger of Two More Volumes of Classic Interviews. Jefferson, North Carolina: McFarland & Company, 2003. .

External links

 
 
 
 

1951 films
1950s science fiction films
Allied Artists films
American science fiction films
Cinecolor films
1950s English-language films
Films about astronauts
Films about extraterrestrial life
Films directed by Lesley Selander
Films produced by Walter Mirisch
American independent films
Mars in film
Monogram Pictures films
1950s independent films
1950s American films